Komal Kothari  was an Indian folk artist and classical singer.

Career
Kothari's research resulted in his development of the study of a number of areas of folklore. In particular, he made contributions to the study of musical instruments, oral traditions and puppetry.

He was also a patron of Langa and Manganiyar folk music, the latter of which translates to 'beggars' and is currently used as a debasing term for Merasi.  He was the first to record them and helped shem out of their traditional regions. To this end, he also founded the magazine 'Prerna'.

Kothari was the chairman of Rupayan Sansthan founded by Chandi Dan Detha and worked with Vijaydan Detha at Borunda village in Rajasthan, an institute that documents Rajasthani folk-lore, arts and music, and spent most of his career at the Rajasthan Sangeet Natak Academy. He died from cancer in April 2004.

Awards and honours
Padma Shri

Padma Bhushan

Rajasthan Ratna award 2012

Legacy
A 1979 documentary film on his ethnomusicology work, and another titled Komal Da, on his life and works, are now archived at Columbia University Libraries.

Works
 Monograph on Langas: a folk musician caste of Rajasthan. 1960.
 Folk musical instruments of Rajasthan: a folio. Rajasthan Institute of Folklore, 1977.
 Gods of the Byways. Museum of Modern Art, Oxford. 1982. .
 Rajasthan: The Living Traditions,Prakash Book Depot. 2000. .
 Life and works of Padma Bhushan Shri Komal Kothari (1929-2004), by Komal Kothari, National Folklore Support Centre, NFSC. 2004.
 Bards, ballads and boundaries: an ethnographic atlas of music traditions in West Rajasthan, by Daniel Neuman, Shubha Chaudhuri, Komal Kothari. Seagull, 2007. .

Further reading
 Rajasthan: An Oral History — Conversations with Komal Kothari, by Rustom Bharucha. Penguin India. 2003. .

See also
 Musical Instruments of Rajasthan

References

External links
 Life and works of Shri Komal Kothari National Folklore Support Centre
 Conversation with Komal Kothari

Indian folklorists
1929 births
2004 deaths
People from Jodhpur
Musicians from Rajasthan
Rajasthani people
Indian magazine editors
Indian ethnomusicologists
Recipients of the Padma Shri in literature & education
Recipients of the Sangeet Natak Akademi Fellowship
Recipients of the Padma Bhushan in arts
20th-century Indian musicians
20th-century musicologists